Nikolay Komlichenko may refer to:

 Nikolay Komlichenko (footballer, born 1973), Russian footballer
 Nikolay Komlichenko (footballer, born 1995), Russian footballer